General elections were held in Venezuela on 4 December 1988. The presidential elections were won by Carlos Andrés Pérez of Democratic Action, who received 52.9% of the vote, whilst his party won the most seats in the Chamber of Deputies and Senate. Voter turnout was 81.9% in the presidential election and 81.7% in the Congressional elections.

Background
Democratic Action President Jaime Lusinchi backed Octavio Lepage to succeed him as the party's candidate for the election, but in a primary election the party chose Carlos Andrés Pérez, (previously president from 1974 to 1979).

Results

President

Congress

References

1988 in Venezuela
Venezuela
Elections in Venezuela
Presidential elections in Venezuela
Election and referendum articles with incomplete results